Anthony Le Tallec (born 3 October 1984) is a French former professional footballer who played as a forward or an attacking midfielder for Liverpool, Sochaux, and Annecy FC.

Club career

Liverpool
Born in Hennebont, Le Tallec was signed from Le Havre AC by Liverpool in 2001, along with his cousin Florent Sinama Pongolle, by manager Gérard Houllier. This was after impressive performances for France at the UEFA European Under-16 Championship and the FIFA U-17 World Cup, with the player being awarded the 'Silver Ball' as the second best player (behind his cousin) in the latter tournament as the national team emerged champions; both players remained a further two years at Le Havre, loaned by the Reds.

Le Tallec scored his first and only Liverpool goal in a UEFA Cup tie against NK Olimpija Ljubljana in October 2003. After his return, he also featured in the club's victorious run in the UEFA Champions League, starting in the home leg of the quarter-final tie against Juventus F.C. but failing to appear in the squad of 18 for the final itself.

For 2005–06, Le Tallec joined fellow Premier League side Sunderland on loan, in a bid to gain some more first-team football. He stated: "I am a competitor and I want to play all the time, but with Liverpool it was impossible. I chose to come to Sunderland because I need to play every week". In a disappointing season for the club, who finished bottom of the table, he was its top scorer with only six goals in all competitions; this included a header against Fulham, helping the Black Cats pick up their only home win.

In May 2006, after Sunderland announced they would not be looking to retain his services, Le Tallec returned to Liverpool but was not given a squad number by boss Rafael Benítez. At the end of the month, he joined up with the French under-21s for the European Championship which took place in Portugal, only featuring in the final group match after the team had already secured qualification and being substituted after 61 minutes.

Return to France
In August 2006, Le Tallec moved to FC Sochaux-Montbéliard on another loan deal. He won the Coupe de France scoring a late equaliser after coming off the bench in the final, which eventually led to a penalty shootout against Olympique de Marseille – a fellow Liverpool player out on loan, Djibril Cissé, netted two goals in the match for the opposition.

On 31 August 2007, it was reported that Scottish Premier League club Heart of Midlothian were close to signing Le Tallec. However, the player ended up moving to Ligue 1 team Le Mans Union Club 72, on loan for the entire season with a view to a permanent deal for approximately £1.1 million pounds.

In July 2008, Le Mans decided to make the loan permanent, signing Le Tallec to a four-year contract. On 27 June 2010, following their top flight relegation, he reached an agreement with fellow league club AJ Auxerre for a four-year deal, worth €3 million.

Atromitos
On 19 July 2015, Le Tallec signed with Atromitos F.C. for two years. He cited the possibility of playing in the UEFA Europa League as the main reason for his signature.

Later years
On 3 July 2017, the 32-year-old Le Tallec joined FC Astra Giurgiu in the Romanian Liga I. He returned to his country in the following transfer window, moving to Ligue 2's US Orléans.

In September 2019, Le Tallec signed with Annecy FC.

He retired from professional football in May 2021 after a twenty-year career.

Personal life
Le Tallec's younger brother, Damien, is also a footballer. Another French youth international who was groomed at Le Havre, he started his professional career in Germany with Borussia Dortmund.

Career statistics

Honours

Club
Liverpool
UEFA Champions League: 2004–05

Sochaux
Coupe de France: 2006–07

International
France U17
FIFA U-17 World Championship: 2001

Individual
FIFA U-17 World Championship Silver Ball: 2001

References

External links
 
 
 
 

1984 births
Living people
People from Hennebont
Sportspeople from Morbihan
Footballers from Brittany
French footballers
Association football midfielders
Association football forwards
Ligue 1 players
Ligue 2 players
Championnat National players
Championnat National 2 players
Championnat National 3 players
Le Havre AC players
AS Saint-Étienne players
FC Sochaux-Montbéliard players
Le Mans FC players
AJ Auxerre players
Valenciennes FC players
US Orléans players
FC Annecy players
Premier League players
Liverpool F.C. players
Sunderland A.F.C. players
Super League Greece players
Atromitos F.C. players
Liga I players
FC Astra Giurgiu players
France youth international footballers
France under-21 international footballers
French expatriate footballers
Expatriate footballers in England
Expatriate footballers in Greece
Expatriate footballers in Romania
French expatriate sportspeople in England
French expatriate sportspeople in Greece
French expatriate sportspeople in Romania